The National Electric Drag Racing Association (NEDRA), a Special Chapter of the Electric Auto Association, and exists to increase public awareness of electric vehicle (EV) performance and to encourage through competition, advances in electric vehicle technology. NEDRA achieves this by organizing and sanctioning safe, silent and exciting electric vehicle drag racing events.

NEDRA is a coalition of drag racing fans, electric drag racing vehicle owners and drivers, individuals interested in promoting the sport of EV drag racing, EV parts suppliers, EV manufacturers and other environmentally concerned companies and individuals. Working together as a group, we put excitement into electric vehicle drag racing.

Examples
Examples of NEDRA vehicles are:
The Maniac Mazda, is a Mazda RX-7 which can achieve 1/4 mile times of under 12 seconds.
Another example is White Zombie, a converted Datsun 1200 sedan which can win against a Dodge Viper and has a best time of 10.25 seconds for the quarter-mile, finishing at 126 mph.

Classification and divisions

NEDRA vehicles are categorized by class and voltage.

The 16 classes are determined by the extent of the vehicle's modification. These comprise Street, Pro-Street and Modified subclasses for both Production and Converted classes; Extreme Street, Funny Car and Dragsters; four Motorcycle classes; Concept Vehicles; and two classes for educational projects.

The 14 voltage divisions range from "J" for 24 volts and below, to "A5" for 600 volts and aboveJ.

NEDRA records
NEDRA maintains a list of fastest race times for both 1/4 and 1/8 mile ET's in the sanctioned classes, on this page.

As of December 2017, the quickest vehicle in the 1/4 mile is the Rocket (motorcycle), with a 6.940 second ET and a trap speed of 201.37 mph set at Virginia Motorsports Park in May 2012. This motorcycle became the first electric vehicle to break 200 mph in the quarter mile. Don Garlits' Swamp Rat has the dragster record, with a 7.274 second ET and a trap speed of 185.6 mph set at Bradenton Motorsport Park in August 2014.

Major events
Electric Dragin'
Wicked Watts
Power of DC
NEDRA Nationals (Woodburn)

See also
 National Hot Rod Association
 Electric dragbike

References

External links
National Electric Drag Racing Association
Messages, photographs, and video summary
Team Blackswan 
Team Killacycle 
Electric Vehicle Racing News

Auto racing organizations
Battery electric vehicle organizations
Drag racing organizations
Electric drag racing